Pseudophycita is a genus of snout moths. It was described by Roesler in 1969. It contains only one species, Pseudophycita deformella, which is found in Ukraine and Russia.

The wingspan is about 23–25 mm.

References

Phycitini
Monotypic moth genera
Moths of Europe
Pyralidae genera